Walter Gaye Schlinkman (May 2, 1922 – October 5, 1994) was an American football player and coach.  He played professionally as a fullback in the National Football League (NFL) for the Green Bay Packers.  The Packers used the 11th pick in the first round of the 1945 NFL Draft to sign Schlinkman out of Texas Technological College (now known as Texas Tech University).  Schlinkman played in 46 games over four seasons with the Packers before he retired from playing in 1949.

Schlinkman began his coaching career as an assistant as Lake Forest College in 1951.  He was hired by Marquette University as an assistant in 1954.  After two years as an assistant at Columbia University, Schlinkman was hired in 1957 as backfield coach by the BC Lions of the Western Interprovincial Football Union, a forerunner of the Canadian Football League West Division.  In 1958, he joined the staff of Jim Owens at the University of Washington.

References

External links

 
 

1922 births
1994 deaths
American football fullbacks
BC Lions coaches
Chicago Cardinals coaches
Columbia Lions football coaches
Houston Oilers coaches
Houston Oilers executives
Green Bay Packers players
Lake Forest Foresters football coaches
Marquette Golden Avalanche football coaches
St. Louis Cardinals (football) coaches
Texas Tech Red Raiders football players
Washington Huskies football coaches
People from Hartley County, Texas
People from Dumas, Texas
Players of American football from Texas